Hyperacanthus is a flowering plant genus in the family Rubiaceae, occurring on Madagascar and nearby southern Africa, approximately from Mozambique to the southernmost parts of the continent.

This genus used to contain only 5 species, but the number has tripled since a number of plants formerly believed to be genip-trees – the "Genipa sensu Drake" group – were recognized to be not as closely related to genips as was previously believed. Those species are now placed in Hyperacanthus, at least provisionally:
 Hyperacanthus ambovombensis Rakotonas. & A.P.Davis
 Hyperacanthus amoenus (Sims) Bridson
 Hyperacanthus exosolenius (formerly in Genipa, tentatively placed here)
 Hyperacanthus grevei Rakotonas. & A.P.Davis
 Hyperacanthus lantzianus (formerly in Genipa, tentatively placed here)
 Hyperacanthus lastellianus (formerly in Genipa, tentatively placed here)
 Hyperacanthus madagascariensis (Lam.) Rakotonas. & A.P.Davis (formerly in Genipa)
 Hyperacanthus mandenensis Rakotonas. & A.P.Davis
 Hyperacanthus microphyllus (K.Schum.) Bridson
 Hyperacanthus perrieri (Drake) Rakotonas. & A.P.Davis (formerly in Genipa)
 Hyperacanthus pervillei (Drake) Rakotonas. & A.P.Davis (formerly in Genipa)
 Hyperacanthus poivrei (Drake) Rakotonas. & A.P.Davis (formerly in Genipa)
 Hyperacanthus ravinensis (Baill. ex Drake) Rakotonas. & A.P.Davis (formerly in Genipa)
 Hyperacanthus talangninia (DC.) Rakotonas. & A.P.Davis (formerly in Genipa)
 Hyperacanthus tubulosus (formerly in Genipa, tentatively placed here)

References 

Rubiaceae genera
Gardenieae
Taxa named by Diane Mary Bridson
Taxa named by Ernst Heinrich Friedrich Meyer